Parnassius davydovi is a high-altitude butterfly which is found in Kyrgyzstan (Tian Shan).
It is a member of the snow Apollo genus (Parnassius) of the swallowtail family (Papilionidae).

Parnassius davydovi is a newly discovered Parnassius species closely related to P. autocrator and P. loxias

References
 Churkin, S. 2006. A new species of Parnassius Latreille, 1804 from Kyrgyzstan (Lepidoptera, Papilionidae) Helios 7: 142-158 PDF
 Omoto,K., Yonezawa,T.and Shinkawa, T. Molecular systematics and evolution of the recently discovered "Parnassian" butterfly (Parnassius davydovi Churkin, 2006) and its allied species (Lepidoptera, Papilionidae). Gene 1:

External links
Parnassius of the World Photograph and map
Sergei Churkin

davydovi
Butterflies described in 2006